Wan'an may refer to these places in China:

Jurisdictions
Wan'an County, a county in Jiangxi
Wan'an Prefecture, a historical prefecture in Hainan

Subdistricts
Wan'an Subdistrict, Shizhu County, in Shizhu Tujia Autonomous County, Chongqing
Wan'an Subdistrict, Quanzhou, in Luojiang District, Quanzhou, Fujian

Towns
Wan'an, Anhui, in Xiuning County, Anhui
Wan'an, Jiangle County, in Jiangle County, Fujian
Wan'an, Wuping County, in Wuping County, Longyan, Fujian
Wan'an, Xinluo District, in Xinluo District, Longyan, Fujian
Wan'an, Hebei, in Li County, Hebei
Wan'an, Hongtong County, in Hongtong County, Shanxi
Wan'an, Xinjiang County, in Xinjiang County, Shanxi
Wan'an, Chengdu, in Shuangliu District, Chengdu, Sichuan
Wan'an, Deyang, in Deyang, Sichuan
Wan'an, Santai County, in Santai County, Sichuan

Townships
Wan'an Township, Fujian, in Pucheng County, Fujian
Wan'an Township, Sichuan, in Enyang District, Bazhong, Sichuan

See also
 (1419–1489), Ming dynasty mandarin